Irrel is a municipality in the district Bitburg-Prüm, in Rhineland-Palatinate, Germany. It is situated in the Eifel, near the border with Luxembourg, at the confluence of the rivers Prüm and Nims. It is located approximately 15 km south-west of Bitburg and 5 km north-east of Echternach.

Irrel was the seat of the former Verbandsgemeinde ("collective municipality") Irrel. Since 1 July 2014 it is part of the Verbandsgemeinde Südeifel.

Sights 
 Devil's Gorge

References

Bitburg-Prüm